The 1933 Toledo Rockets football team was an American football team that represented Toledo University in the Ohio Athletic Conference during the 1933 college football season. In their third season under head coach Jim Nicholson, the Rockets compiled a 4–2–2 record.

Schedule

References

Toledo
Toledo Rockets football seasons
Toledo Rockets football